Beverly Gage is an American academic who is a professor of history and American studies at Yale University. She was the director of the Brady-Johnson Program in Grand Strategy at Yale. She is the author of The Day Wall Street Exploded: A Story of America in Its First Age of Terror (Oxford University Press, 2009) and G-Man: J Edgar Hoover and the Making of the American Century (Viking, 2022). In 2021, Gage was nominated to the National Council on the Humanities.

Education and career 
Gage attended Yale as an undergraduate, graduating in 1994 with a degree in American studies, then earned her PhD in history at Columbia University in 2004.

In September 2021, she announced that she would resign as director of the Grand Strategy program, effective December 2021, citing concerns about academic freedom and a "board of visitors" that was formed to oversee her work. In an interview with The New York Times, she stated, "It’s very difficult to teach effectively or creatively in a situation where you are being second-guessed and undermined and not protected." On October 1, 2021, the Yale history department issued a statement in support of her.

Her 2022 book G-Man was a finalist for the 2023 National Book Critics Circle award in biography.

References

External links 
 
 "How to Ensure This Never Happens Again - The election and its aftermath have revealed weaknesses in our democracy. Here’s how we can fix some of them." - The New York Times, January 8, 2021, by Beverly Gage and Emily Bazelon

21st-century American historians
21st-century American women writers
American women historians
Columbia Graduate School of Arts and Sciences alumni
Date of birth missing (living people)
Living people
Place of birth missing (living people)
Yale College alumni
Yale University faculty
Year of birth missing (living people)